USS L-2 (SS-41) was an L-class submarine of the United States Navy.

Description
The L-class boats designed by Electric Boat (L-1 to L-4 and L-9 to L-11) were built to slightly different specifications from the other L boats, which were designed by Lake Torpedo Boat, and are sometimes considered a separate class. They displaced  on the surface and  submerged. The L-class submarines had a crew of 28 officers and enlisted men.

For surface running, the Electric Boat submarines were powered by two  diesel engines, each driving one propeller shaft. When submerged each propeller was driven by a  electric motor. They could reach  on the surface and  underwater.

The boats were armed with four 18-inch (450 mm) torpedo tubes in the bow. They carried four reloads, for a total of eight torpedoes. The Electric Boat submarines were initially not fitted with a deck gun; a single 3"/50 caliber gun on a disappearing mount was added during the war.

Construction and career
L-2s keel was laid down on 19 March 1914 by the Fore River Shipbuilding Company in Quincy, Massachusetts. She was launched on 11 February 1915 sponsored by Mrs. Russel Gray, and commissioned on 29 September 1916.

Service history
After exercises along the Atlantic coast, L-2 arrived in Key West, Florida, for experiments in submarine warfare.  After operating in southern waters through March 1917, the submarine prepared for World War I service.

Departing New London, Connecticut, on 27 November 1917, L-2 steamed for Europe via the Azores, arriving Queenstown, Ireland, on 27 January 1918. Based at Bantry Bay, Ireland, she patrolled around the British Isles and, with other members of her squadron, ranged the North Atlantic Ocean, reducing losses to U-boats of shipping vital in supplying the Allied armies. L-2 attacked enemy submarines on 26 May and 10 July with inconclusive results.

After the war, L-2 departed the Isle of Portland, England, on 3 January 1919 for home. Arriving Philadelphia, Pennsylvania, in early February, the submarine experimented with torpedo and undersea detection techniques along the Atlantic coast until 1922. L-2 was placed in reduced commission at New London on 1 May 1922, and decommissioned at Hampton Roads, Virginia, on 4 May 1923. She was scrapped and her materials were sold on 28 November 1933, in accordance with the terms of the London Naval Treaty.

Notes

References

External links
 

United States L-class submarines
World War I submarines of the United States
Ships built in Quincy, Massachusetts
1915 ships